Alexandre Marine (born September 30, 1958, in Krasnoyarsk, Siberia) is a Russian-born actor-director-playwright currently based in Montreal. On April 23, 1993, he was recognized by the Russian government as a Distinguished Artist of the Russian Federation.

His award-winning productions include "The Blue Rose" (Special Jury Prize at Amurskaya Osen' in Blagoveshensk), "...the itsy bitsy spider..." (Best of Baltimore, 2010), "Marie Stuart" (Best Montreal production, 2007–2008 season) and "Amadeus" (Best English-language production, 2006–2007 season)

Apart from his career as a stage actor and stage director, he has appeared in several Russian films.

Tabakov Theatre 

Marine began his career as an actor at Oleg Tabakov's theatre (commonly known as the Tabakerka), where he had his directorial debut, later becoming a staff director at the theatre.

Select Credits as Stage Director 
 2015: "The Tempest.Variations" translated from English by Alexandre Marine, Tabakov Theatre, Moscow, Russia
 2015: "KNOCK: A Journey to a Strange Country" adapted by Alexandre Marine and Boris Zilberman, Lost & Found Project, New York City, New York
 2013: "COVERS" by Ruvym Gilman and Boris Zilberman, Lost & Found Project, New York City, New York
 2012: "Sister Hope" based on Alexander Volodin's play "Elder Sister," Tabakov Theatre, Moscow, Russia
 2012: "Waiting for the Barbarians" adapted from J.M. Coetzee's novel Waiting for the Barbarians, Baxter Theatre Centre, Cape Town, South Africa 
 2012: "Marriage 2.0", adapted from Anton Chekhov's short stories and one act plays, Tabakov Theatre, Moscow, Russia
 2011: "The Blue Rose", adapted from Tennessee Williams' The Glass Menagerie, VIP-Theatre, Moscow, Russia
 2010: Vassa, adapted from Maxim Gorky, Théâtre du Rideau Vert, Montréal
 2009: "...the itsy bitsy spider...", adapted from Fyodor Dostoevsky's The Possessed, Studio Six Theater Company, New York City (with performances in Bridgeport, CT, Baltimore, MD and Montreal, Quebec, Canada)
 2009: "A Streetcar Named Desire" by Tennessee Williams, Théâtre du Rideau Vert, Montréal, Canada
 2009: "The Swan" by Elizabeth Egloff, Premiere, Moscow, Russia
 2009: "Le Boeuf sur le toit", music by Darius Milhaud, based on a scenario by Jean Cocteau, I Musici de Montréal, Montréal, Canada
 2008: "Dangerous Liaisons" by Christopher Hampton, at the Leonor and Alvin Segal Theatre at the Segal Centre for Performing Arts, Montréal, Canada
 2008: "The Postman Always Rings Twice", a 2008 play based on the novel by James M. Cain, Imperiya Zvezd, and, later, Master Theatre, Moscow, Russia
 2008: "Hay Fever" by Noël Coward, Moscow Art Theatre, Moscow, Russia
 2007: "The Emigrants" by Slawomir Mrozek, Théâtre Deuxième Réalité, Montréal, Canada
 2007: "Marie Stuart" by Friedrich Schiller, Théâtre du Rideau Vert, Montréal, Canada
 2006: "The Old Maid and the Thief" by Gian Carlo Menotti, I Musici de Montréal, Montréal, Canada
 2005: "Antiformalist Rayok" by Dmitri Shostakovich, I Musici de Montréal, Montréal, Canada
 2004: "Macbeth.com based on Shakespeare's play, Starvin' Kitty Productions, New York, NY
 2004: "Antony and Cleopatra" by Shakespeare, ACRON Theatre, Tokyo, Japan
 2003: "Arcadia by Tom Stoppard, Tabakov Theatre, Moscow, Russia
 2003: "The Seagull 2288" based on Chekhov's play, ArcLight Theatre, New York, NY
 2002: "Duck Hunting" by Aleksandr Vampilov, Moscow Art Theatre, Moscow, Russia
 2001: "The Beatles Babes" by Sergei Volynets, Moscow Art Theatre, Moscow, Russia
 2000: "Mother Courage" by Bertolt Brecht, Hayuza Theatre, Tokyo, Japan
 1999: "Hamlet" by Shakespeare, Théâtre Deuxième Réalité, Montréal, Canada
 1997: "Sublimation of Love" by Aldo De Benedetti, Tabakov Theatre, Moscow
 1996: "We" adapted from Yevgeny Zamyatin's eponymous novel, Théâtre Deuxième Réalite, Montréal, Canada
 1980: "Dr. Faustus" by Goethe, Tabakov Studio, Moscow, Soviet Union

Select Credits as Stage Actor 
 2015: Prospero in "The Tempest.Variations" based on Shakespeare's The Tempest, Tabakov Theatre, Moscow, Russia
 2007: Ensemble in "12" based on the works of Russian poets during the Silver Age of Russian Poetry, Théâtre Deuxième Réalité, Montréal, Canada
 2004: Semyon Podsekalnikov in Nikolai Erdman's "The Suicide", Théâtre Deuxième Réalité, Montréal, Canada
 1994: Nikolay Ivanovich in "Mechanical Piano" based on Chekhov's early works, Tabakov Theatre, Moscow, Russia
 1991: Raskolnikov in Dostoevsky's "Crime and Punishment," Theatre Atelier, Moscow, Soviet Union
 1989: Khlestakov in Gogol's "The Inspector General," Tabakov Theatre, Moscow, Soviet Union
 1988: Epstein in Neil Simon's "Biloxi Blues," Tabakov Theatre, Moscow, Soviet Union
 1983: Alan Strang in Peter Shaffer's Equus (play), Pushkin Theatre, Moscow, Soviet Union
 1979: Longnose in "Two Arrows," Tabakov Studio, Moscow, Soviet Union

References 

Living people
Russian male actors
1958 births
Actors from Krasnoyarsk
Russian theatre directors